"Astrologen" is a song written by Magnus Uggla, appearing on his 1983 album Välkommen till folkhemmet. The characteristic string arrangement was, as usual, made by Anders Henriksson.

Uggla wrote the song while being together with a girl who was interested in astrological signs. He first wanted to sing it as a duet with Agnetha Fältskog, but she was working on a solo album, and Uggla said he was afraid of asking.

The song was recorded by Date for their 2010 album Här och nu!.

Darin Zanyar performed the song in the 2012 edition of Så mycket bättre (season 3). His version peaked at number two on the Swedish Singles Chart.

Charts

Darin Zanyar version
Weekly charts

Darin Zanyar version
Year-end charts

References

1983 songs
Darin (singer) songs
Magnus Uggla songs
Songs written by Magnus Uggla
Swedish-language songs